Friedrich "Fritz" Morf (29 January 1928 – 30 June 2011) is a Swiss football defender who played for Switzerland in the 1962 FIFA World Cup. He also played for FC Grenchen.

References

External links
 

1928 births
2011 deaths
Swiss men's footballers
Switzerland international footballers
Association football defenders
FC Grenchen players
1962 FIFA World Cup players
People from Burgdorf, Switzerland
Sportspeople from the canton of Bern